Franklin Bruno (born December 29, 1968) is an American singer-songwriter, academic and writer originally from Upland, California. He has been a member of Nothing Painted Blue since its inception in 1986.

Bruno has written music criticism for online and print publications such as The Village Voice. In 2004, he received a doctorate in philosophy from UCLA. , he is a lecturer at SUNY Purchase. Previously he has been a faculty member at Pomona College, Northwestern University, and Bard College.

In addition to his own recordings, Bruno worked on The Mountain Goats albums Tallahassee and The Sunset Tree.  He also records with The Mountain Goats frontman John Darnielle as The Extra Lens. Jenny Toomey and Calexico released Tempting, a collection of Bruno's songs, on Misra Records in December 2002.

Civics, the first album by Bruno's new band, The Human Hearts, was released by Tight Ship Records in 2007.

Discography

Albums
 Suggestion Box (Shrimper, 1991) [cassette-only]
 Etudes for Voice and Snackmaster  (Shrimper, 1993) [cassette-only]
 A Bedroom Community (Simple Machines, 1995)
 Kiss Without Makeup (Absolutely Kosher, 2000)
 A Cat May Look at a Queen (Absolutely Kosher, 2002)
 Martial Arts Weekend (recorded with John Darnielle, as The Extra Glenns) (Absolutely Kosher, 2002)
 Civics (Tight Ship Records, 2007) (as The Human Hearts)
 Local Currency (Fayettenam Records, May 2009)
 Undercard Recorded with John Darnielle as The Extra Lens (Merge Records, November 2010)
 Another (Shrimper Records, 2012) (as The Human Hearts)

EPs
 Hermetic Geometry (Baby Huey, 1992) [7-inch]
 The Irony Engine (Walt Records, 1993) [7-inch]
 A Sand Dollar Relief Map (Shrimper, 1995) [7-inch]
 La Radia (Little Teddy, 1997) [Germany] [7-inch]
 Participant (Dark Beloved Cloud, 1997) [lathe-pressed 7-inch]
 Set of Pipes (Dark Beloved Cloud, 2003) [3-inch CD]

Compilation appearances
 "Clean Needle", from Winky Dog cassette (Shrimper, 1990)
[Also included on Shrimper's Abridged Perversion (A Shrimper Compilation of Shrimper Compilations). It was re-recorded for Kiss Without Makeup.]
 "Love Tap", from Capgun cassette (Shrimper, 1991)
 "Hey Jude", from Back to the Egg, Asshole cassette (Shrimper, 1991)
[NOT a Beatles cover. Credited to 'Nubber' on cassette cover.]
 "Lifetime Seance", from the Ghost of A Rollercoaster 7" (Shrimper, 1991)
[This song was later recorded with a different arrangement and released as "Masonic Eye" on the Nothing Painted Blue album Placeholders.]
 "Rhythm Buddy", from Pawnshop Reverb cassette (Shrimper, 1992)
 "The Irony Engine", from I Like Walt! 7" (Walt Records, 1994)
 "Sleeping Through The Jane Pratt Show" (live), from Working Holiday! bonus disc (Simple Machines, 1994)
[The original version of this song appeared the year before on "The Irony Engine" EP.]
 "What Are You Doing New Year's Eve?" (written by Frank Loesser), from The Wedding Record 7" (Walt Records, 1995)
 "Cat Scratch Fever", from Our Salvation Is in Hand (Theme Park, 1995)
[NOT a Ted Nugent cover.]
 "Pony Song" (written by Salem 66), from Chutes and Ladders cassette (Cactus Gum, 1996)
 "Purity Test", from Green Light Go! (BottleCap, 1995)
 "Chiliagon", from Childhood Friends cassette (Brassland, circa 1995)
 "Winter's Just A Word", from the Songs From A Room 7" (Sing, Eunuchs!, 1996)
 "Missed The Point", (demo version) from Go cassette (Papsicle, 1996)
[Demo version of a Nothing Painted Blue song, recorded solo in 1989.]
 "The Rice King", from The Basement Tapes vol. 2 (KSPC, 1997)
 "MGM" (written by The Triffids), from the Exhibit B cassette (Circumstantial Evidence, 1997)
 "Invisible Mistletoe", from The Tarquin Records All Star Holiday Extravaganza (Tarquin, 1997)
 "Linoleum" (written by Paste), from From The Bullpen (Hey Buddy, 1997)
 "Bronze Me", from We Can Still Be Friends (Magic Marker, 1998)
 "Your Inarticulate Boyfriend" (radio session), from IPS (WNYU, 1998)
[Originally appeared on the album Etudes For Voice and Snackmaster. It was also recorded by Jenny Toomey on Tempted.]
 "Shooting Past Me", from I Stayed Up All Night Listening To Records (Anyway, 1998)
 "Nickname Stuck" (Absolutely Kosher, 2002)
 "A Cat May Look at a Queen" (Absolutely Kosher, 2002)

Bibliography
 Elvis Costello's Armed Forces (Continuum Books' 33⅓ series, 2005)
 The Role of Intentional Action in Artifactual Representation (PhD dissertation, The University of California, Los Angeles, 2005)

References

External links 

Franklin Bruno, official website
nervous unto thirst, Bruno's blog
konvolut m, Bruno's old blog
A Cat May Look at a Queen – PopMatters review

Singer-songwriters from California
American male singer-songwriters
Bard College faculty
People from Upland, California
Living people
American music critics
1968 births
Journalists from California
Pomona College faculty
Shrimper Records artists
Merge Records artists